Chlorosea roseitacta is a species of emerald moth in the family Geometridae. It is found in North America.

The MONA or Hodges number for Chlorosea roseitacta is 7015.

References

Further reading

External links

 

Geometrinae
Moths described in 1912